Margot Lambert (born 15 March 1999) is a French badminton player. She started playing badminton at the age of 8 in Tahiti, and now affiliate with Club de l'Hermitage et du Tournonais. She was part of the national team that won the gold medal at the 2017 European Junior Championships. Lambert was the women's doubles National Champions in 2020.

Achievements

BWF International Challenge/Series (4 titles, 4 runners-up) 
Women's doubles

  BWF International Challenge tournament
  BWF International Series tournament
  BWF Future Series tournament

References

External links 
 

1999 births
Living people
People from Guilherand-Granges
French female badminton players
Sportspeople from Ardèche